Nový Bor (until 1948 Hajda) is a town in Česká Lípa District in the Liberec Region of the Czech Republic. It has about 11,000 inhabitants. The town is known for its glass industry. The historic town centre is well preserved and is protected by law as an urban monument zone.

Administrative parts
Town parts and villages of Arnultovice, Bukovany, Janov and Pihel are administrative parts of Nový Bor.

Etymology
The town's original German name Heyde was derived from local vegetation and means "heather". The Czech name Nový Bor was also derived from local vegetation and literally means "new pine forest".

Geography
It lies mostly in the Ralsko Uplands, but in the north the municipal territory also extends into the Lusatian Mountains and Central Bohemian Uplands.

History
The first written mention of is from 1471, when the village Arnsdorff (Arnultovice) was founded, today a part of Nový Bor. In 1692, a new settlement was founded, and its construction was completed in 1703. The settlement was originally connected by mayor's law with Arnultovice, but it became separate in 1713.

In 1710, it became a property of the Kinsky noble family, and under their rule the settlement grew. At their request, the settlement was promoted to a town in 1757. Since the end of the 18th century Nový Bor became known for its large glass industry (as happened in the whole region). In 1869, the railway was built.

During the 19th and 20th centuries, several villages were merged with Nový Bor, as the last Arnultovice in 1924. 

From 1938 to 1945 it was annexed by Nazi Germany and administered as part of Reichsgau Sudetenland. In 1948, it was renamed to its current Czech name.

Demographics

Economy

Nový Bor is known for its glass production. The Crystalex company is the largest glassworks in the country and belongs among the most significant regional employers.

Transport
The European route E442 bypasses the town.

Sport
The local chess club, 1. Novoborský ŠK, has been the most successful club in the top-tier Czech team competition in the 21st century. Between the 2009–10 and 2017–18 seasons, the club won nine consecutive titles.

Sights

The historic centre is formed by Míru Square, Palackého Square and theirs surroundings. The centre includes valuable Empire and Biedermeier houses. The town hall is from 1751, originally built as a  manorial granary.

Church of the Assumption of the Virgin Mary was rebuilt to its present Baroque form in 1786–1788. It containts a bell from 1606 and a rare organ. The Virgin Mary statue behind the church is from the 18th century and is the oldest monument in the town.

The history of the glass industry in the region is presented in the Glass Museum Nový Bor. In addition to the permanent exhibition there are exhibitions of glass craftsmen.

Notable people
Josef Max (1804–1855), German-Czech sculptor
Emanuel Max (1810–1901), German-Czech sculptor
Wilhelm Knechtel (1837–1924), German-Czech gardener and botanist
Ernst Schwarz (1895–1983), German philologist
Volker Oppitz (born 1931), German economist and mathematician
Věra Bradáčová (born 1955), athlete

Twin towns – sister cities

Nový Bor is twinned with:
 Aniche, France
 Břeclav, Czech Republic
 Frauenau, Germany
 Oybin, Germany
 Zwiesel, Germany

Gallery

References

External links

 
Culture in Nový Bor and Česká Lípa 

Cities and towns in the Czech Republic
Populated places in Česká Lípa District
Lusatian Mountains
Glass production